was a Japanese scholar and philosopher of the West European Medieval philosophy. Member of the Japan Academy since 1998.

Yamada graduated from the Kyoto Imperial University, Philosophy section of the Department of Literature in 1944.
 1951, Instructor of the Osaka City University, Department of Literature
 1955, Assistant professor of the Osaka City University
 1965, Assistant professor of the Kyoto University, Department of Literature
 1968, Professor of the Kyoto University
 1976, Director of Department of Literature in the Kyoto University
 1985, Professor emeritus of the Kyoto University
 1985–1990, Professor of the Nanzan University, Department of Literature
 1990–1997, Lecturer of the Nanzan University

Yamada won the Osaragi Jirou Award by Lectures on Augustinus in 1987. He wrote many studies books on Augustine, Thomas Aquinas et al., and edited and translated their books.

Yamada died at the age of eighty-five, at Kamakura, Kanagawa Prefecture, on 29 February 2008.

Works 
The following books are all in Japanese.
 The Fundamental Problems of Augustinus - 1st Book of Studies on Medieval Philosophy, (1977), Soubunsha, 
 The Studies on Thomas Aquinas' ESSE - 2nd Book of Studies on Medieval Philosophy, (1978), Soubunsha, 
 The One Who is the One Existing - 3rd Book of Studies on Medieval Philosophy, (1979), Soubunsha,
 The Studies on Thomas Aquinas' RES - 4th Book of Studies on Medieval Philosophy, (1986), Soubunsha,
 Poem Anthology - The Songs of Morning and Evening, (1986), Shinchi shobou
 Lectures on Augustinus, (1986), Shinchi shobou, 
 The Christology of Thomas Aquinas, (1999), Soubunsha,

Translation and Others 
 Thomas Aquinas Summa Thelogiae, Soubunsha, (Yamada translated many volumes in this translation programme.)
 The World Fine Books, 14th vol. - Augustinus, ed. et translation, (1968), Chuou-Kouronsha, 
 The World Fine Books, 2nd season, 5th vol. - Thomas Aquinas, ed. et translation, (1975), Chuou-Kouronsha, 

1922 births
2008 deaths
Kyoto University alumni
20th-century Japanese philosophers
Academic staff of Kyoto University
Nanzan University